The forty-first season of the NBC comedy series Saturday Night Live premiered on October 3, 2015, during the 2015–2016 television season. The season premiered on October 3, 2015, with host & musical guest Miley Cyrus and concluded on May 21, 2016 with host Fred Armisen and musical guest Courtney Barnett.

Kate McKinnon won the Primetime Emmy Award for Outstanding Supporting Actress in a Comedy Series for her work in this season.

Cast
After two consecutive seasons with higher-than-average levels of cast turnover, no major changes occurred prior to this season; the entire cast of the 2014–2015 season returned. 

Prior to the start of the season, comedian Jon Rudnitsky of The Groundlings joined the show as a featured player. Beck Bennett, Colin Jost, Kyle Mooney, and Sasheer Zamata were all upgraded to repertory status, while Michael Che, Pete Davidson, and Leslie Jones remained as featured players. 

Announcer Darrell Hammond appeared in several episodes. After Taran Killam played Donald Trump in the season premiere, Hammond played him for the remainder of the year, as well as playing Bill Clinton in three episodes.

This would be the final season for Taran Killam and Jay Pharoah, both cast members since 2010, as well as the only season for Jon Rudnitsky.

Cast roster

Repertory players
Vanessa Bayer
Beck Bennett
Aidy Bryant
Colin Jost
Taran Killam 
Kate McKinnon
Kyle Mooney
Bobby Moynihan
Jay Pharoah 
Cecily Strong
Kenan Thompson
Sasheer Zamata

Featured players
Michael Che
Pete Davidson
Leslie Jones
Jon Rudnitsky

bold denotes "Weekend Update" anchor

Writers  

Before the beginning of the season, six new writers joined the staff: Upright Citizens Brigade performers Fran Gillespie, Sudi Green, and Will Stephen; former Late Show with David Letterman writers Paul Masella and Chris Belair; and stand-up comedian Dave Sirus.

Colin Jost, a cast member on the show and anchor of Weekend Update, who served as a writer since 2005 (and as co-head writer in 2012), was relieved of his position as co-head writer, although he remains on the writing staff. Rob Klein and Bryan Tucker continue as co-head writers.

Episodes

Specials

References

41
Saturday Night Live in the 2010s
2015 American television seasons
2016 American television seasons
Television shows directed by Don Roy King